João Pedro de Sá Mendonça (born 20 January 2004), simply known as João Pedro, is a Brazilian professional footballer who plays as a midfielder for Botafogo-SP.

Career statistics

Club

References

2004 births
Living people
Brazilian footballers
Association football midfielders
Botafogo Futebol Clube (SP) players